Hà Minh Tuấn (born 1 January  1991) is a Vietnamese footballer who plays as a forward for V.League 1 club SHB Đà Nẵng

Hà Minh Tuấn is dubbed by the Vietnamese media as the successor of the former Vietnamese star striker Lê Huỳnh Đức for both his physique and playing style. Lê Huỳnh Đức was once Tuấn's coach at SHB Đà Nẵng.

Tuấn was a part of the SHB Đà Nẵng F.C. team that played in the 2013 AFC Cup; he made 5 appearances and scored 1 goal against Ayeyawady United F.C.

Honours

Club
Quảng Nam
 V.League 1: 2017

References 

1991 births
Living people
Vietnamese footballers
Association football forwards
V.League 1 players
SHB Da Nang FC players
Quang Nam FC players
People from Quảng Nam province